Buckner & Garcia was an American musical duo consisting of Jerry Buckner and Gary Garcia from Akron, Ohio. Their first recording was made in 1972, when they performed a novelty song called "Gotta Hear the Beat", which they recorded as Animal Jack.  Later, in 1980, they wrote a novelty Christmas song titled "Merry Christmas in the NFL", imagining sports journalist Howard Cosell as Santa Claus. The recording was credited to Willis the Guard (a character performed by Atlanta radio personality Bob Carr) and fictional group Vigorish. The song reached No. 82 on the Billboard charts. In 1981, the duo wrote a faith-based country theme to back the poem "Footprints in the Sand", performed by Edgel Groves, which reached No. 1 on many Country and Easy Listening radio stations. The duo also produced an extended version of the WKRP in Cincinnati theme song released on MCA Records in 1982.

However, the duo is best known for their hit novelty song "Pac-Man Fever", released in 1981 on a local record label, BGO Records. Shortly after the duo signed a record deal with Columbia/CBS Records and the record was released nationally. An album of the same name quickly followed based entirely of video game songs. The single and album both received gold records for combined sales of over two and a half million copies worldwide. The duo later followed up that single with "Do the Donkey Kong", which only made the Bubbling Under Hot 100 Charts, peaking at No. 103.

History
The duo's intended follow-up to "Pac-Man Fever" was "E.T., I Love You", which was delayed for release by the label in favor of Neil Diamond's unauthorized "Heartlight". They released a re-recorded version of the song on their 1999 album Now & Then. The Starlight Children's Chorus recorded a cover version on their album E.T., I Love You & Other Extra Terrestrial Songs for Children. In 1985, Anne Murray's recording of "On and On", a song written by Jerry Buckner, became a top 10 hit on the Country/Easy Listening charts.

In the mid-1990s, Sony Music Entertainment declined to re-release the Pac-Man Fever album to CD for reasons unknown. To meet the growing demand for a reissue of the album, the band released a re-recorded version on CD in 1999. When the duo re-formed the band in 1999 to re-record the album, Danny Jones became the group's drummer, Whitaker having died in the interim. Stewart returned as bassist; none of the other band members returned. The duo followed this up with Now & Then, an album that included four new songs  including a new recording of "E.T., I Love You".

The pair continued to collaborate, including writing and performing on many original songs for the national restaurant chain Waffle House jukeboxes, several of which were released on a pair of albums.

In 2009, "Pac-Man Fever" ranked at No. 98 on VH1's "Top 100 Greatest One-Hit Wonders of the 80s" list. On June 10, 2010, the duo released a song titled "Keepin' the Dream Alive", with part of the proceeds being donated to aid the All-American Soap Box Derby in their hometown of Akron.

On September 9, 2011, Buckner & Garcia revealed its new song on Whiskey Media's Big Live Live Show: Live 2, called "Found Me the Bomb", which is about the gaming website Giant Bomb. The song was made after an interview in June 2011, in which Jerry Buckner and Gary Garcia called in during a live Pac-Man tournament Giant Bomb was having. Ryan Davis jokingly said during a podcast that the duo should make a song about them and then to his shock one day he received an mp3 containing the new song. The song was distributed free on giantbomb.com and also appeared on the Rock Band Network.

On November 17, 2011, Gary Garcia died unexpectedly at his home in Englewood, Florida, at age 63. Buckner later worked with Jamie Houston to write the song "Wreck It, Wreck-It Ralph!" for the Disney film Wreck-It Ralph (2012).

Jerry Buckner
Following Gary Garcia's death in 2011, Jerry continued on as a songwriter, keyboardist, and arranger. His songs have been recorded by Anne Murray ("On and On"), Bertie Higgins ("The Wall"), Bobby Vinton ("The Wall"), and Seiko ("So in Love with You").  He has scored original music for television and motion picture soundtracks along with jingles for a variety of commercial clients including Coca-Cola, Papa John’s, DirecTV and Waffle House.

In 2012, Buckner co-produced and performed the title track to the hit Disney movie Wreck-It Ralph, which received numerous awards, including Critics' Choice for “Best Movie”, Annie awards for “Best Movie” and “Best Soundtrack” and was nominated for an Oscar.

Original members of the duo's band consisted of Ginny Whitaker (drums), Larry McDonald (bass guitar), Chris Bowman (lead and rhythm guitar), Rick Hinkle (lead and rhythm guitar on "Pac-Man Fever", "Mousetrap" and "Goin' Berserk"), Mike Stewart (Moog synthesizer on "Mousetrap" and "Goin' Berserk"), and David "Cozy" Cole (syndrum on Pac-Man Fever). Steve Carlisle and Sharon Scott provided background vocals on "Pac-Man Fever".

Albums and track list

Pac-Man Fever
"Pac-Man Fever" (Pac-Man)
"Froggy's Lament" (Frogger)
"Ode to a Centipede" (Centipede)
"Do the Donkey Kong" (Donkey Kong)
"Hyperspace" (Asteroids)
"The Defender" (Defender)
"Mousetrap" (Mouse Trap)
"Goin' Berzerk" (Berzerk)

Now & Then
"Do the Funky Broadway"
"Pogwild" (Pogs)
"It's Allright"  
"Hostage"
"E.T., I Love You"
"E.T., I Love You" (Karaoke Version)
"Pac-Man Fever" (Karaoke Version)
"Pac-Man Fever" (Unplugged Version)

Now & Then (rerelease)
"Hostage"
"E.T., I Love You"
"Mr. T"
"I Gotta Hear the Beat"
"Loose in the Streets"

Band members
Pac-Man Fever (1981‒1982)
Gary Garcia - lead vocals, guitar
Jerry Buckner - keyboards, background vocals
Chris Bowman - guitar
Larry McDonald - bass
Ginny Whitaker - drums
David "Cozy" Cole - syndrum (on "Pac-Man Fever")
Rick Hinkle - guitar (on "Pac-Man Fever", "Mousetrap" and "Goin' Berzerk")
Steve Carlisle -  background vocals (on "Pac-Man Fever")
Sharon Scott - background vocals (on "Pac-Man Fever")
Mike Stewart - Moog synthesizer (on "Mousetrap" and "Goin' Berzerk")

1982‒1999
Gary Garcia - lead vocals, guitar
Jerry Buckner - keyboards, background vocals
Chris Bowman - guitar
Mike Stewart - bass, keyboards
Ginny Whitaker - drums

1999‒2011
Gary Garcia - lead vocals, guitar
Jerry Buckner - keyboards, background vocals
Mike Stewart - bass, guitar, keyboards, background vocals
Danny Jones - drums, background vocals

Wreck-It, Wreck-It Ralph (2012)
Danny Jones - lead vocals, drums
Jerry Buckner - keyboards, background vocals
Chris Bowman - guitar
Mike Stewart - bass, keyboards

References

External links

Full discography, including singles

retroCRUSH Interview transcript
Creative Loafing article and interview
Re-release of Now and Then, with new tracks
Buckner & Garcia – Pac-Man Fever (1982, Vinyl)

American musical duos
Musical groups established in 1980
Musical groups disestablished in 2011
Rock music groups from Ohio
Columbia Records artists
Musical groups from Akron, Ohio
Video game musicians